Stuart Hancox is a literary translator and gained an MFA in Literary Translation and Creative Writing from the University of Arkansas at Fayetteville. He was also a doctoral candidate in comparative literature at UArk. Since 2003, he has been working as a User Interface specialist in New York City.

Hancox won the University of Arkansas Press Award for his translation of Improvisations on a Missing String by the Lebanese writer Nazik Saba Yared. He also won the Gary Wilson Award in Translation from the University of Arkansas Press in 1995 and 1996.

See also
 List of Arabic-English translators

References

English translators
Arabic–English translators
Living people
Year of birth missing (living people)